The Pennridge–Quakertown Thanksgiving Day Football Classic is an American high school football rivalry played annually on Thanksgiving morning between the Rams of Pennridge High School (Perkasie, PA) and the Panthers of Quakertown Community High School (Quakertown, PA). The rivalry has been played uninterrupted every Thanksgiving morning since the inaugural meeting in Quakertown on November 27, 1930, with the exception of the 1989 game which was postponed two days due to a snowstorm. Quakertown High School hosts the contest on even years while Pennridge High School (formerly Sellersville-Perkasie High School) hosts on odd years. Kickoff time is traditionally set at 10:15 am EST.

Origins 
The Thanksgiving Day rivalry officially begins in 1930, but the roots of the rivalry begin ten years earlier. Prior to the formation of the Consolidated Sellerville-Perkasie (Sell-Perk) High School in 1930, the boroughs of Sellersville and Perkasie maintained independent school districts.  In 1920, a revitalized Quakertown football program led by Jacob L. Stoneback challenged neighboring Perkasie High School to a football game, beginning what would become an annual affair among the North Penn League schools.  Through the 1920s, Perkasie High School maintained a slight edge over Quakertown High, leading the competitive series with 4 wins, 3 losses, and 3 ties.  In 1930, the Perkasie and Sellersville school districts were joined to form the Sellersville-Perkasie School District. With the Consolidated School opening its doors for the 1930–1931 school year, the decision was made to showcase the rivalry on Thanksgiving morning in 1930.  From this began what would become one of the oldest high school football rivalries in Pennsylvania. In 1953, Sellersville-Perkasie High School would form the core of the present-day Pennridge School District as it absorbed additional school districts from the surrounding boroughs and townships.

Locations 
Pennridge

Although the new Consolidated Sellersville-Perkaise High School opened its doors in September 1930, athletic fields had not yet been constructed on school grounds. At that time, the Sellersville-Perkasie football team would alternate home games between the former home fields of the constituent schools, Sellersville Playground (now Druckenmiller Park) and Perkasie Playground (now Kulp Park).  Perkasie Playground was chosen as the location of the 1931 Thanksgiving Day game among the two fields. In a joint school board meeting on August 1, 1932, the decision was made to spend $2,000 to develop athletic fields adjacent to the school as a means to stimulate the depressed local economy. On October 13, 1933, the new school football field was dedicated at the first home game of the season against Lansdale (now North Penn) High School.  In 1972, the school field was dedicated to the memory of former teacher, coach, and assistant principal Lloyd R. "Poppy" Yoder, memorialized by a plaque donated by the Pennridge Class of 1972. After 81 seasons, including 41 Thanksgiving games at Poppy Yoder Memorial Field, and much debate among the community, the decision was made to move the home of the Rams to the grounds of the present-day high school.  On September 26, 2014, the first game was played on the artificial turf of Helman Field against Neshaminy High School. Helman Field was named in honor of longtime teacher, athletic director, and longest-serving head football coach, Wayne Helman. In 2015, phase two of construction of Helman Field saw the expansion of facilities including concessions, a ticket booth, and locker rooms. In 2018, the school district sold the naming rights of the complex to Grand View Health, giving the field its current name, Helman Field at Grand View Health Stadium.

Quakertown

In 1929 Quakertown School District opened a new junior-senior high school on Seventh Street (present-day Quakertown Elementary School) with a football field built on the adjoining property.  All of the first four Thanksgiving home games from 1930 to 1936 were played on this field with the exception of the 1934 game which was held at the Quakertown Fair Grounds (known as LuLu Park, on the present-day site of Quakertown Senior High School). With the assistance of $19,000 available from WPA funding, new athletic fields including a football field, baseball diamond, and cinder track were constructed in 1937. On October 9, 1937, the football field was dedicated to much fanfare. In July 1939, the school board named the new gridiron "Alumni Field", recognizing the efforts of the alumni association to raise $3,000 to purchase the perimeter cyclone fence and class plates. Through the years, numerous improvements have been made to Alumni Field including a multi-phase project started in 2004 to install new bleachers, team rooms, concessions, rest rooms, and a press box as well as revamp the sod and mitigate draining issues. In 2014, the school board approved a $1.3 million plan to convert the natural grass to artificial turf and further address the drainage issues that have long plagued the grounds. On September 19, 2014, Quakertown played their first home game on their new artificial turf against Wiliiam Tennent High School.

Game results 

† Indicates league championship, ‡ Indicates shared league championship

Coaching records 
Since 1930, thirteen head coaches have led the Quakertown Panthers in the Thanksgiving Day game, while twelve have led the Pennridge Rams.  Wayne Helman (PHS: 1955–1980) has coached more Thanksgiving Day games (26) and more victories (18) than any other coach.  Though Helman achieved the most wins, Randy Cuthbert (PHS: 2005–2012), Frank Krystyniak (PHS: 1981–1987), Joe Musso (QHS: 1946–1951) and Cody Muller (PHS: 2018–2021) achieved a higher winning percentage.

1930s 

Thursday, November 27, 1930 — Sellersville-Perkasie @ Quakertown 

Thursday, November 26, 1931 — Quakertown @ Sellersville-Perkasie 

Thursday, November 24, 1932 — Sellersville-Perkasie @ Quakertown 

Thursday, November 30, 1933 — Quakertown @ Sellersville-Perkasie 

Thursday, November 29, 1934 — Sellersville-Perkasie @ Quakertown 

Thursday, November 28, 1935 — Quakertown @ Sellersville-Perkasie 

Thursday, November 26, 1936 — Sellersville-Perkasie @ Quakertown 

Thursday, November 25, 1937 — Quakertown @ Sellersville-Perkasie 

Thursday, November 24, 1938 — Sellersville-Perkasie @ Quakertown 

Thursday, November 23, 1939 — Quakertown @ Sellersville-Perkasie

1940s 

Thursday, November 28, 1940 — Sellersville-Perkasie @ Quakertown 

Thursday, November 27, 1941 — Quakertown @ Sellersville-Perkasie 

Thursday, November 26, 1942 — Sellersville-Perkasie @ Quakertown 

Thursday, November 25, 1943 — Quakertown @ Sellersville-Perkasie 

Thursday, November 23, 1944 — Sellersville-Perkasie @ Quakertown 

Thursday, November 22, 1945 — Quakertown @ Sellersville-Perkasie 

Thursday, November 28, 1946 — Sellersville-Perkasie @ Quakertown 

Thursday, November 27, 1947 — Quakertown @ Sellersville-Perkasie 

Thursday, November 25, 1948 — Sellersville-Perkasie @ Quakertown 

Thursday, November 24, 1949 — Quakertown @ Sellersville-Perkasie

1950s 

Thursday, November 23, 1950 — Sellersville-Perkasie @ Quakertown 

Thursday, November 22, 1951 — Quakertown @ Sellersville-Perkasie 

Thursday, November 27, 1952 — Sellersville-Perkasie @ Quakertown 

Thursday, November 26, 1953 — Quakertown @ Pennridge 

Thursday, November 25, 1954 — Pennridge @ Quakertown 

Thursday, November 24, 1955 — Quakertown @ Pennridge 

Thursday, November 22, 1956 — Pennridge @ Quakertown 

Thursday, November 28, 1957 — Quakertown @ Pennridge 

Thursday, November 27, 1958 — Pennridge @ Quakertown 

Thursday, November 26, 1959 — Quakertown @ Pennridge

1960s 

Thursday, November 24, 1960 — Pennridge @ Quakertown 

Thursday, November 23, 1961 — Quakertown @ Pennridge 

Thursday, November 22, 1962 — Pennridge @ Quakertown 

Thursday, November 28, 1963 — Quakertown @ Pennridge 

Thursday, November 26, 1964 — Pennridge @ Quakertown 

Thursday, November 25, 1965 — Quakertown @ Pennridge 

Thursday, November 24, 1966 — Pennridge @ Quakertown 

Thursday, November 23, 1967 — Quakertown @ Pennridge 

Thursday, November 28, 1968 — Pennridge @ Quakertown 

Thursday, November 27, 1969 — Quakertown @ Pennridge

1970s 

Thursday, November 26, 1970 — Pennridge @ Quakertown 

Thursday, November 25, 1971 — Quakertown @ Pennridge 

Thursday, November 23, 1972 — Pennridge @ Quakertown 

Thursday, November 22, 1973 — Quakertown @ Pennridge 

Thursday, November 28, 1974 — Pennridge @ Quakertown 

Thursday, November 27, 1975 — Quakertown @ Pennridge 

Thursday, November 25, 1976 — Pennridge @ Quakertown 

Thursday, November 24, 1977 — Quakertown @ Pennridge 

Thursday, November 23, 1978 — Pennridge @ Quakertown 

Thursday, November 22, 1979 — Quakertown @ Pennridge

1980s 

Thursday, November 27, 1980 — Pennridge @ Quakertown 

Thursday, November 26, 1981 — Quakertown @ Pennridge 

Thursday, November 25, 1982 — Pennridge @ Quakertown 

Thursday, November 24, 1983 — Quakertown @ Pennridge 

Thursday, November 22, 1984 — Pennridge @ Quakertown 

Thursday, November 28, 1985 — Quakertown @ Pennridge 

Thursday, November 27, 1986 — Pennridge @ Quakertown

Thursday, November 26, 1987 — Quakertown @ Pennridge 

Thursday, November 24, 1988 — Pennridge @ Quakertown 

Saturday, November 25, 1989 — Quakertown @ Pennridge

1990s 

Thursday, November 22, 1990 — Pennridge @ Quakertown 

Thursday, November 28, 1991 — Quakertown @ Pennridge 

Thursday, November 26, 1992 — Pennridge @ Quakertown 

Thursday, November 25, 1993 — Quakertown @ Pennridge 

Thursday, November 24, 1994 — Pennridge @ Quakertown 

Thursday, November 23, 1995 — Quakertown @ Pennridge 

Thursday, November 28, 1996 — Pennridge @ Quakertown 

Thursday, November 27, 1997 — Quakertown @ Pennridge 

Thursday, November 26, 1998 — Pennridge @ Quakertown 

Thursday, November 25, 1999 — Quakertown @ Pennridge

2000s 

Thursday, November 23, 2000 — Pennridge (10-3) @ Quakertown (8-4) 

Thursday, November 22, 2001 — Quakertown (8-4) @ Pennridge (8-3) 

Thursday, November 28, 2002 — Pennridge (8-4) @ Quakertown (10-3) 

Thursday, November 27, 2003 — Quakertown (9-4) @ Pennridge (10-3) 

Thursday, November 25, 2004 — Pennridge (10-3) @ Quakertown (7-5) 

Thursday, November 24, 2005 — Quakertown (4-8) @ Pennridge (7-5) 

Thursday, November 23, 2006 — Pennridge (7-5) @ Quakertown (4-8) 

Thursday, November 22, 2007 — Quakertown (1-11) @ Pennridge (3-9) 

Thursday, November 27, 2008 — Pennridge (6-6) @ Quakertown (9-3) 

Thursday, November 26, 2009 — Quakertown (8-4) @ Pennridge (6-6)

2010s 

Thursday, November 25, 2010 — Pennridge (7-5) @ Quakertown (4-8) 

Thursday, November 24, 2011 — Quakertown (5-7) @ Pennridge (7-5) 

Thursday, November 22, 2012 — Pennridge (12-2) @ Quakertown (1-10) 

Thursday, November 28, 2013 — Quakertown (7-5) @ Pennridge (8-4) 

Thursday, November 27, 2014  — Pennridge (7-5) @ Quakertown (11-2) 

Thursday, November 26, 2015 — Quakertown (10-3) @ Pennridge (8-4) 

Thursday, November 24, 2016 — Pennridge (6-6) @ Quakertown (6-6) 

Thursday, November 23, 2017 — Quakertown (7-4) @ Pennridge (11-3) 

Thursday, November 22, 2018 — Pennridge (5-6) @ Quakertown (9-4) 

Thursday, November 28, 2019 — Quakertown (3-8) @ Pennridge (3-8)

2020s 

Thursday, November 26, 2020 — Pennridge (7-1) @ Quakertown (5-3) 

Thursday, November 25, 2021 — Quakertown (13-1) @ Pennridge (7-5) 

Thursday, November 24, 2022  — Pennridge (2-9) @ Quakertown (6-6)

Notable players 

 Tim Lewis, defensive backs coach for the St. Louis BattleHawks (XFL) and former NFL player for the Green Bay Packers (1983-1986)
 Will Lewis, American football executive and former NFL player for the Seattle Seahawks (1980-1981)
 Louis Riddick, analyst for Monday Night Football on ESPN and former NFL defensive back for the Atlanta Falcons (1992,1996), Cleveland Browns (1993-1995), and Oakland Raiders (1998)
 Robb Riddick, former NFL running back for the Buffalo Bills (1981-1988)
 Ken Schroy, former NFL defensive back for the New York Jets (1977-1984)

References 

High school football games in the United States
American football in Pennsylvania